Beasts is a novel by American writer John Crowley, published in 1976 by Doubleday.

Plot summary
Beasts describes a world in which genetically engineered animals are given a variety of human characteristics. Painter is a leo, a combination of man and lion. Reynard, a character derived from medieval European fable, is part fox.

Political forces result in the leos being deemed an experimental failure, first resigned to reservations, and later to be hunted down and eliminated. A central element of the story is the relationship between Painter and Reynard, who acts as a kingmaker behind the scenes.

Reception
The New York Times reviewer Gerald Jonas praised Crowley's "prodigious inventiveness", describing the novel as "a memorable tale that ends too soon."

Brian W. Aldiss and David Wingrove reported that "for all the poetry in Crowley's writing, Beasts treats its subject matter in a realistic mode that gives the book a resonance and a relevance it might otherwise have lacked."

Dave Langford reviewed Beasts for White Dwarf #99, and stated that "The slightest of Crowley's works? I recant: anything by him demands to be read and reread."

References

External links

1976 science fiction novels
American science fiction novels
Books illustrated by Anne Yvonne Gilbert
1976 American novels
Novels by John Crowley
Doubleday (publisher) books